

Background

North Central Jr/Sr high school is located south of Farmersburg, Indiana on US Highway 41. If you are looking for it, it can be found just across from the Brampton Brick factory and just south of the WTWO News Channel TWO station. The school celebrated its 50th year of service in 2007-08. It is currently the only high school and one of 4 schools in the Northeast school corporation of Sullivan County, IN.

North Central's mascot is the Thunderbirds, named for all the explosions that came from the old Thunderbird Mine, that operated nearby Farmersburg and Shelburn, Indiana at the time of the start of the school.

Athletics

North Central is a Class A school with Indiana High School Athletic Association (IHSAA) membership.  The school was formerly a member of the Tri-River Conference until it disbanded in 2010.  The school's athletic programs now participate as a member of the Southwestern Indiana Conference.

Statistics

These are some statistics of the school as off of the Indiana Department of Education website

Student Migration

2006-07 to 2007-08
Farmersburg Elementary School 41 Pupils
Shelburn Elementary School 28 Pupils
Hymera Elementary School 17 Pupils
Honey Creek Middle School 5 Pupils

Ethnicity

2007-08
96.7% White 502 Pupils
1.7% Multi-Racial 9 Pupils
0.8% Hispanic 4 Pupils
0.6% Native American 3 Pupils
0.2% Asian 1 Pupil
0.4% Black  2 Pupils

Free Lunch

2007-08
Paid Lunch 52.2% 271 Pupils
Reduced Lunch 14.8% 77 Pupils
Free Lunch 32.9% 171 Pupils

Attendance Rate

Preliminary Data 2007-08
State Average 95.9%
Total 95.1%
Male 95.2%
Female 95.0%
Multi-Racial 95.2%
White 95.2%

ISTEP Results

2008-09 Fall

English/LA

7th Grade - 77 Pupils Tested,0% Pass Plus 0 Pupils, 49% Passed 38 Pupils, 51% Failed 39 Pupils
8th Grade - 100 Pupils Tested, 10% Pass Plus 10 Pupils, 53% Passed 53 Pupils, 36% Failed 36 Pupils, 1% Undetermined 1 Pupil
9th Grade - Not Tested In Fall Of 2008
10th Grade - 89 Pupils Tesed, 0% Pass Plus 0 Pupils, 62% Passed 55 Pupils, 36% Failed 32 Pupils, 2% Undetermined 2 Pupils

Mathematics

7th Grade - 77 Pupils Tested, 10% Pass Plus 8 Pupils, 68% Passed 52 Pupils, 21% Failed 16 Pupils, 1% Undetermined 1 Pupil
8th Grade - 100 Pupils Tested, 12% Pass Plus 12 Pupils, 53% Passed 53 Pupils, 35% Failed 35 Pupils,
9th Grade - Not Tested In Fall Of 2008
10th Grade - 89 Pupils Tested, 2% Pass Plus 2 Pupils, 54% Passed 48 Pupils, 44% Failed 39 Pupils,

SAT
2007-08
40% of Seniors Taking

Average Scores

Writing 473
Mathematics 494
Critical Reading 470
Composite Score College-Bound Seniors(Verbal & Math) 964

Graduation Rate
2006-07
87.5% of Pupils
63 Pupils
28.6% Honors Grads 18 Pupils
34.9% Core 40 Only 22 Pupils
36.5% Regular Grads 23 Pupils
73% Pursuing College Education 46 Pupils

Other
2006-07 or 2007-08
7% Taking An Advanced Placement Test
10% Of Seniors Taking An ACT Exam
23.6 ACT Composite Score

See also
 List of high schools in Indiana

References

External links
 Official School Website

Public high schools in Indiana
Schools in Sullivan County, Indiana
Public middle schools in Indiana
1957 establishments in Indiana